Beatty Lake is a lake in the Canadian province of Saskatchewan. The lake is set in rolling hills of Jack pine forest and muskeg in Saskatchewan's Northern Administration District. The lake is adjacent to Beaver River near where Beatty Creek flows into Beaver River. Access is from the Hanson Lake Road.

Beatty Lake Recreation Site 
Beatty Lake Recreation Site is a recreation site that encompasses the entirety of Beatty Lake and extends as far east as Beaver River and Highway 155. The park has 12 campsites, a fish cleaning station, dock, and sandy beach. Several hiking trails branch out from the park into the surrounding hills.

See also 
List of lakes of Saskatchewan
List of protected areas of Saskatchewan

References 

Lakes of Saskatchewan